Meringue is a type of dessert or candy, often associated with French, Italian, Swiss and Polish cuisines, traditionally made from whipped egg whites and sugar, and occasionally an acidic ingredient such as lemon, vinegar, or cream of tartar. A binding agent such as salt, flour or gelatin may also be added to the eggs. The key to the formation of a good meringue is the formation of stiff peaks by denaturing the protein ovalbumin (a protein in the egg whites) via mechanical shear. 

They are light, airy and sweet confections. Homemade meringues are often chewy and soft with a crisp exterior, while many commercial meringues are crisp throughout. A uniform crisp texture may be achieved at home by baking at a low temperature for an extended period of up to two hours.

History

The Oxford English Dictionary states that the French word is of unknown origin. The name meringue for this confection first appeared in print in François Massialot's cookbook of 1692. The word meringue first appeared in English in 1706 in a translation of Massialot's book. The first documented recipes recognizable as meringues are found in two considerably earlier 17th-century English manuscript books of recipes which give instructions for confections called "white biskit bread" in the book of recipes written in 1604 by Elinor Fettiplace (c.1570 – c.1647) of Gloucestershire and called "pets" in the manuscript of collected recipes written by Lady Rachel Fane (1612/13–1680) of Knole, Kent. Slowly baked meringues are still referred to as "pets" in the Loire region of France due to their light and fluffy texture.

Meringues were traditionally shaped between two large spoons, as they are generally at home today. Meringue piped through a pastry bag was introduced by Antonin Carême.

Types
There are several types of meringue: the sweetened, beaten egg whites that form the "islands" of floating island (also known in French as ); the partly cooked toppings of lemon meringue pie and other meringue-topped desserts; and the classic dry featherweight meringue. Different preparation techniques produce these results.
 French meringue, or basic meringue, is the method best known to home cooks. Fine white sugar (caster sugar) is beaten into egg whites.
 Italian meringue was invented by the French chef  Lancelot de Casteau in 1604. It is made with boiling sugar syrup, instead of caster sugar. This creates a much more stable soft meringue which can be used in various pastries without collapsing. In an Italian meringue, a hot sugar syrup is whipped into softly whipped egg whites until stiff, and until the meringue becomes cool. It will not deflate for a long while and can be either used for decoration on pie, or spread on a sheet or baked Alaska base and baked.
 Swiss meringue is whisked over a bain-marie to warm the egg whites, and then whisked steadily until it cools. This forms a dense, glossy marshmallow-like meringue. It is usually then baked.
 Vegan meringue is imitation meringue made using aquafaba with a small dose of vinegar and caster sugar. It holds similar characteristics to that of egg-based meringue, but it will quickly burn if torched or baked incorrectly. Another variation uses potato protein instead of aquafaba.

Chemistry

Protein distribution in egg whites is as follows: (54%) ovalbumin, (13%) conalbumin/ ovotransferrin, (11%) ovomucoid, (4%) ovoglobulins, (3.5%) lysozyme, and (2%) ovomucin. Ovoglobulins drive foaming, ovomucin is the main stabilization agent, and the remainder of the proteins interact to contribute to overall foaming and stability. When egg whites are beaten, some of the hydrogen bonds in the proteins break, causing the proteins to unfold ("denature") and to aggregate non-specifically. When these egg white proteins denature (due to agitation from beating), their hydrophobic regions are exposed and the formation of intermolecular protein-protein interactions is promoted. These protein-protein interactions, usually disulfide bridges, create networks responsible for the structure of the foam and this change in structure leads to the stiff consistency required for meringues. The use of a copper bowl, or the addition of cream of tartar is required to additionally denature the proteins to create the firm peaks, otherwise the whites will not be firm. Wiping the bowl with a wedge of lemon to remove any traces of grease can often help the process.

When beating egg whites, they are classified in three stages according to the peaks they form when the beater is lifted: soft, firm, and stiff peaks.

Egg whites and sugar are both hygroscopic (water-attracting) chemicals. Consequently, meringue becomes soggy when refrigerated or stored in a high-humidity environment.  This quality also explains the problem called "weeping" or "sweating", in which beads of moisture form on all surfaces of the meringue. It can also happen if the meringue is undercooked (resulting in a puddle of liquid under the meringue) or overcooked (resulting in beading on top).  Sweating is a particular problem for French meringues in which the granulated sugar is inadequately dissolved in the egg whites, and for high-moisture pie fillings.

Compound interactions
There are three main ingredients in a meringue recipe that interact to form the foam structure: egg whites, sugar, and cream of tartar or acid. The backbone of the foam structure is made up of proteins, amino acid chains. Egg whites provide the meringue with necessary proteins that form the meringue foam. The proteins are originally oriented in a tangled ball but must be uncoiled into strands; this is referred to as denaturation. There are two ways a protein can be denatured: through physical or chemical process. When forming a meringue the egg whites are beat until the proteins are denatured - a physical process. Also by beating the egg whites, air is incorporated into the protein structure creating an air–water protein mixture interface. The friction from beating the eggs adds heat to the process, which causes the proteins to increase in elasticity. As the proteins are being stretched during the denaturation process they are also coagulating together forming a protein network. After the denaturation process the egg whites will become six to eight times their original size. If the proteins are beat for too long they will become stretched out too far and become too weak to support the foam structure.

Cream of tartar, also known as potassium hydrogen tartrate, is added to the egg whites before the denaturation process. Cream of tartar is an acid that is used to help stabilize and coagulate the proteins, which aids in a stronger protein network to trap air for the foam formation. Cream of tartar has a low pH to help bring the proteins near their isoelectric point to allow them to be denatured easier. The isoelectric point is a specific pH where a molecule, in this case protein, has no net electrical charge. The electrical charge on a protein would normally hold the protein together in its coiled clump.

The cream of tartar also acts as a catalyst affecting the sugar structure. Sucrose is a disaccharide made up of glucose and fructose. Cream of tartar inverts the sugar during the baking process, meaning the molecule is split into two parts containing glucose and fructose. This prevents the sugar from recrystallizing and giving the meringue a gritty, undesirable texture.

Sugar is the final ingredient that is used to help form and stabilize the foam structure. Sugar is hydrophilic, extracting water out of the egg whites. This will lighten the protein network, allowing the foam to be stronger and more elastic. The sugar dissolves in the protein network but does not become part of the protein network. The sugar must be added slowly to the egg whites, while continuously mixing. If it is added all at once, it will not be evenly distributed, causing the protein network to collapse due to the weight of the sugar in one area of the meringue.

After a strong protein network has formed a complete foam, the meringue is ready to be baked. Adding heat to the mixture is the final step to strengthen the foam structure. The meringue must be baked at a low temperature for a long period of time. This allows the proteins to finish coagulating, strengthening the meringue evenly throughout. If the proteins are not baked evenly, the bottom of the meringue will not be able to support the structural weight, causing the meringue to collapse. The heat causes the air bubbles to expand, creating an airier structure. The water in the structure evaporates, causing the meringue to become lighter with a stronger foam structure. It is important to not evaporate all of the water out of the meringue, as some water is necessary to hold the foam together.

Uses

Cookies 

Meringue cookies are baked at a very low heat for a long time. Another name for them is forgotten cookies, as they can be left in an oven for a long time after the cooking is done. They are not supposed to become tan at all, but they need to be very crisp and dry. They will keep for at least a week if stored in an airtight container.

Desserts 
In some recipes, the meringue may be cooked at a higher temperature for a shorter amount of time, resulting in a soft meringue with slightly browned peaks on top. Meringue by itself is also a dessert called "meringue kisses".
In Switzerland, meringues are often associated with Gruyère cream.

Variations include assorted fruits such as raspberries, peaches, mangoes, cherries, strawberries, blueberries, blackberries, pineapple, papayas, honeydew, oranges, and cantaloupe.

Embellishment 
Meringue may be used for embellishment. It can be formed into whimsical shapes, such as mushrooms, or piped into a crisp basket that is baked and filled with cake, fruit, or flowers.

Shelf life
Meringue is not a stable structure and has a short shelf life of about two weeks if stored properly. Meringue is a hygroscopic food, thus it absorbs water from the air. The high sugar concentration in the meringue absorbs moisture from the air and will cause the meringue to become soft and chewy. The more water that is absorbed, the heavier the meringue becomes. After enough water is absorbed, the meringue will become too heavy for the foam structure to support itself, and it will start to collapse. Meringue is so susceptible to absorbing water that a rainy day may disrupt the foam structure formation and make it impossible to form a meringue.

Storing meringues in an airtight container will prevent humidity from affecting the sugar. It is also recommended to store the meringue in a cooler area. If the meringue is stored in these conditions, its shelf life will be about two weeks. To extend the shelf life up to about three months, the meringue can be stored in the freezer. The colder temperatures in the freezer decrease the humidity. The meringue should still be stored in an airtight container, preventing water from affecting the meringue.

Nutritional content
The principal nutritional components are protein from the egg whites and simple carbohydrates from the refined sugar.

See also 
 Culinary Heritage of Switzerland
 Divinity (confectionery)
 Honeycomb toffee
 List of egg dishes
 Marshmallow creme

Notes and references

External links

 
 Douglas Muster, "The Origins and History of Meringue"

Egg dishes
French cuisine
Swiss cuisine
Italian cuisine
Polish cuisine
Confectionery